Hongqiao Township is a township under the administration of Wanyuan City in far northeastern Sichuan province, China, situated about  from the border with Shaanxi and  northwest of downtown Wanyuan as the crow flies. , it has 5 villages under its administration.

References 

Township-level divisions of Sichuan